AIDAluna is a Sphinx class cruise ship, owned by US based Carnival Corp and operated by AIDA Cruises. Built by Meyer Werft shipyards in Papenburg, Germany, she is the third ship of the class, preceded by AIDAdiva and AIDAbella, and is followed by AIDAblu, AIDAsol, and AIDAmar. The ship has a capacity of 2,100 passengers and has a gross tonnage of 69,203. AIDAluna was initially deployed in the Baltic Sea for the 2009 Summer season. In Winter 2009, she was redeployed in Canary Islands. AIDAluna has an 8 × 4.5-m poolside theater, which is a first for AIDA Cruises.

Concept and Construction

AIDAluna is the third ship, out of a series of six ships, ordered by AIDA Cruises at Meyer Werft, with expected delivery of one ship each year from 2007 to 2012. She is a sister ship of AIDAdiva, AIDAbella, AIDAblu, AIDAsol, and AIDAmar. The first order was only for two ships, but the option extended to six ships.<ref name="Meyer">AIDA Cruises orders two new club ships  Meyerwerft website. 19 October 2004. Retrieved 8 May 2010</ref> She floated out of drydock on 10 February 2009. AIDAluna started her sea trials with her passage on the River Ems on 21 February 2009, departing Papenburg. The voyage culminated in Emdem the next day. On 23 February, departing Emden to continue sea trials, she ventured to Blohm + Voss shipyard in Hamburg for final inspection at dock Elbe 17. During the inspection, an object was seen, being tangled on AIDAlunas propellers, which was supposedly caused by the ship's short trip. After a few days, AIDAluna was cleared and continued her sea trials in the North Sea. AIDAluna was delivered to its owners on 16 March 2009. She was christened on April 4, 2009 at Palma de Mallorca by the German supermodel, Franziska Knuppe.

Amenities

The ship has 1,025 passenger cabins. AIDAluna has a 2,300-m2 (25,000-ft2) spa facility. The ship has 7 restaurants and 11 bars.

The focal point in the ship is the Theatrium, a three-level complex, which could be transformed into a Theater. An onboard 4-D Cinema is fitted with moving chairs.

Operational historyAIDAluna started her maiden voyage on 22 March 2009, departing Hamburg. This 14-day voyage culminated in Palma de Mallorca, with stops at Le Havre, Santander, A Coruña, Lisbon, Cadiz, Tangier, Valencia, and Barcelona. In Summer 2009, she was deployed in Baltic Sea and in Winter, she was redeployed in Canary Islands. AIDAluna made her first call in Kiel on 22 April and in Rostock-Warnemünde on 8 May, departing from Palma de Mallorca. She made 10 roundtrip cruises in the Baltic during the 2009 Summer season. In 2011, AIDAluna was redeployed in the Caribbean and offered 14-day cruises, with additional 6 to 8-day sailings. On her way to the Caribbean, AIDAluna sailed the East Coast, calling in New York City.

 Incidents 
At around 5 a.m. on 9 September 2018, the German pop singer Daniel Küblböck jumped overboard when the vessel was in open waters about 185 km north of St. John's in the Labrador Sea. The Canadian Coast Guard launched a search operation,AIDAluna: Daniel Küblböck wird auf Kreuzfahrtschiff vermisst. In: abendblatt.de, 9 September 2018. assisted by AIDAluna and the Holland America cruise ship Zuiderdam''.

References

External links

 Official website of AIDAluna 
 Photos
 YouTube video clip during the launch of AIDAluna
 
 

Ships built in Papenburg
Ships of AIDA Cruises
2009 ships